Ezekiel 36 is the thirty-sixth chapter of the Book of Ezekiel in the Hebrew Bible or the Old Testament of the Christian Bible. This book contains the prophecies attributed to the prophet/priest Ezekiel, and is one of the Books of the Prophets. This chapter contains two prophecies, one conveying "hope for the mountains of Israel" (verses 1–15) and one declaring that Israel's restoration is assured (verses 16–38). Biblical commentator Susan Galambush pairs the first of these with an oracle condemning Mount Seir in Edom in the previous chapter.

Text
The original text was written in the Hebrew language. This chapter is divided into 38 verses.

Textual witnesses
Some early manuscripts containing the text of this chapter in Hebrew are of the Masoretic Text tradition, which includes the Codex Cairensis (895), the Petersburg Codex of the Prophets (916), Aleppo Codex (10th century), and Codex Leningradensis (1008). Fragments containing parts of this chapter were found among the Dead Sea Scrolls, that is, the Ezekiel Scroll from Masada (Mas 1d; MasEzek; 1–50 CE) with extant verses 1–10, 13–14, 17–35.

There is also a translation into Koine Greek known as the Septuagint, made in the last few centuries BCE. Extant ancient manuscripts of the Septuagint version include Codex Vaticanus (B; B; 4th century), Codex Alexandrinus (A; A; 5th century) and Codex Marchalianus (Q; Q; 6th century).

Verse 1
 "And you, son of man, prophesy to the mountains of Israel, and say,
 ‘O mountains of Israel, hear the word of the Lord!’" (NKJV)
 "Son of man" (Hebrew: בן־אדם -): this phrase is used 93 times to address Ezekiel.
 "Mountains of Israel" (Hebrew: הרי ישראל  ): refers to "the land of Israel", called "the ancient heights" (verse 2) as the highlands and the hill country are central to its geography.

Verse 2
 Thus says the Lord God: “Because the enemy has said of you,
 ‘Aha! The ancient heights have become our possession,’” (NKJV)

See also
Edom
Israel
Jerusalem
Related Bible parts: Jeremiah 31, Romans 11

Notes

References

Bibliography

External links

Jewish
Ezekiel 36 Hebrew with Parallel English
Ezekiel 36 Hebrew with Rashi's Commentary

Christian
Ezekiel 36 English Translation with Parallel Latin Vulgate

36